Hockey at the 1960 Olympics may refer to:

Ice hockey at the 1960 Winter Olympics
Field hockey at the 1960 Summer Olympics